Hovapeza is a genus of true crane fly.

Distribution
Madagascar

Species
H. costofuscata Alexander, 1958
H. tisiphone (Alexander, 1951)

References

Tipulidae
Diptera of Africa